William Wilkinson (born 4 April 1951) was a Scottish footballer who began his football career in 1967–68 playing for Dumbarton.  His career breakthrough came in the 1971–72 season, making 23 appearances and contributing to Dumbarton's promotion to Scottish Football League Division One.  Over the following two seasons, Wilkinson made 51 appearances before moving to Alloa Athletic in Division Two, where he scored 6 goals in 120 appearances. He later moved to Brisbane, Australia, where he played in the National Soccer League with Brisbane City. Wilkinson's son, Barry, returned to Scotland to join Dumbarton and spent two years with the club from 1998-2000.

References

External links
Billy Wilkinson at Aussie Footballers

1951 births
Scottish footballers
Dumbarton F.C. players
Alloa Athletic F.C. players
Scottish Football League players
National Soccer League (Australia) players
Living people
Place of birth missing (living people)
Association football defenders
St Anthony's F.C. players
Scottish expatriate footballers
Expatriate soccer players in Australia
Brisbane City FC players